Víctor Manuel Casadesús Castaño (born 28 February 1985) is a Spanish professional footballer who plays for Andorran club Atlètic Club d'Escaldes as a forward.

Club career
Casadesús was born in Algaida, Mallorca. A product of hometown RCD Mallorca's youth ranks, he first appeared officially with the first team on 17 April 2005 in a 0–0 La Liga home draw against Valencia CF, and established himself as a useful attacking player in the following seasons.

In the second half of 2007–08 campaign, Casadesús served a six-month loan at Segunda División club Real Sociedad, scoring regularly during his stint but not being able to help the Basques ultimately promote to the top flight. He returned subsequently to the Balearic Islands but, in August 2008 was again loaned, to Gimnàstic de Tarragona also in the second tier, being again recalled after netting a career-high 13 goals.

In 2009–10, Casadesús found himself backing up in-form Aritz Aduriz, and appeared more prominently in the Copa del Rey. On 14 January 2010, he helped the team come from behind against Rayo Vallecano with a brace for an eventual 3–1 home win (4–3 aggregate), but had to be stretchered off with a broken clavicle. In the league, the side finished fifth – fourth until the last minute of the last matchday – and qualified for the UEFA Europa League, with the player contributing four goals.

Casadesús alternated between divisions one and two after leaving Mallorca in January 2014, with Levante UD, CD Tenerife and AD Alcorcón. The 34-year-old moved to down to the Segunda División B in summer 2019, signing for FC Andorra.

International career
Casadesús appeared for Spain at the 2004 UEFA European Under-19 Championship, scoring for the eventual champions in the 2–2 semi-final draw with Ukraine (penalty shootout victory after 120 minutes).

Honours
Levante
Segunda División: 2016–17

Spain U19
UEFA European Under-19 Championship: 2004

References

External links

1985 births
Living people
Spanish footballers
Footballers from Mallorca
Association football forwards
La Liga players
Segunda División players
Segunda División B players
RCD Mallorca B players
RCD Mallorca players
Real Sociedad footballers
Gimnàstic de Tarragona footballers
Levante UD footballers
CD Tenerife players
AD Alcorcón footballers
FC Andorra players
Primera Divisió players
Inter Club d'Escaldes players
Atlètic Club d'Escaldes players
Spain youth international footballers
Spanish expatriate footballers
Expatriate footballers in Andorra
Spanish expatriate sportspeople in Andorra